Kwame Nkrumah University of Science and Technology (KNUST) is a public University of Ghana that focuses on science and technology. The Kwame Nkrumah University of Science and Technology is the public university established in the country, as well as the largest university in the Kumasi Metropolis and in the Ashanti Region of Ghana. KNUST has its roots in the plans of Agyeman Prempeh I, a ruler of the Ashanti Kingdom, to establish a university in Kumasi as part of his drive towards modernization of his Ashanti kingdom. This plan never came to fruition due to the clash between British empire expansion and the desire for King Prempeh I to preserve his Ashanti kingdom's independence.

However, his younger brother and successor, King Asantehene Agyeman Prempeh II, upon ascending to the Golden Stool in 1935, continued with this vision. Events in the Gold Coast in the 1940s played into his hands. First there was the establishment of the University College of the Gold Coast. Secondly, there were the 1948 Accra riots and the consequent Watson Commission report which recommended that a university of sciences be established in Kumasi. Thus, in 1949, the dream of the Prempehs became a reality when building started on what was to be called the Kumasi College of Technology.

The Kumasi College of Technology offered admission to its first students to the engineering faculty in 1951 (however, those students started academic work in 1952), and an Act of Parliament gave the university its legal basis as the Kumasi College of Technology in 1952. The nucleus of the college was formed from 200 teacher training students transferred from Achimota College in the Greater Accra Region. The college was affiliated to the University of London. In 1961, the college was granted full university status.

The university covers a total land area of 2512.96 acres.

Ranks 
In November 2019, KNUST was ranked as the best university in Ghana and West Africa by U.S. News & World Report. It was also ranked 14th in Africa and 706th in the world, with a global score of 42.4. In November 2020 it was ranked the best for the second time by U.S. News & World Report. This time it climbed 2 positions to be 12th best in Africa.

The latest Times Higher Education impact ranking in 2022 adjudged KNUST as the best university in quality education in Africa and 14th globally.

History

Early history 

The Kumasi College of Technology opened officially on 22 January 1952 with 200 teacher training students transferred from Achimota, to form the nucleus of the new college. In October 1952, the School of Engineering and the Department of Commerce were established and the first students were admitted. A Pharmacy Department was established in January 1953, with the transfer of the former School of Pharmacy from Korle Bu Teaching Hospital, Accra, to the college. The department ran a two-year comprehensive course in Pharmacy leading to the award of the Pharmacy Board Certificate. A Department of Agriculture was opened in the same year to provide ad hoc courses of varying duration, from a few terms to three years, for the Ministry of Agriculture. A Department of General Studies was instituted to prepare students for the Higher School Certificate Examinations in Science and Arts subjects and to give instruction in subjects as requested by the other departments.

From 1952 to 1955, the School of Engineering prepared students for professional qualifications only. In 1955, the school embarked on courses leading to the University of London Bachelor of Engineering External Degree Examinations.

In 1957, the School of Architecture, Town Planning and Building was inaugurated. Its first students were admitted in January 1958, for professional course. 

As the college expanded, it was decided to make the Kumasi College of Technology a purely science and technology institution. In pursuit of this policy, the Teacher Training College, with the exception of the Art School, was transferred in January 1958, to the Winneba Training College; in 1959 the Commerce Department was transferred to Achimota to form the nucleus of the present School of Administration of the University of Ghana, Legon.

In December 1960, the Government of Ghana appointed a University Commission to advise it on the development of university education, in connection with the proposal to transform the University College of Ghana and the Kumasi College of Technology into an independent University of Ghana. Following the report of the commission which came out early 1961, the government decided to establish two independent universities in Kumasi and Legon, Accra. The Kumasi College of Technology was thus transformed, under the supervision of R. P. Baffour, into a full-fledged University Kwame Nkrumah University of Science and Technology by an Act of Parliament on 22 August 1961. The name honors Kwame Nkrumah, the first prime minister and later president of Ghana.

In January 1966, Marr Grounds, an American/Australian artist then living in California, took up an appointment as lecturer in architecture for two years, before moving to the University of Sydney School of Architecture, Design and Planning in 1968.

The name was changed to University of Science and Technology after the coup of 24 February 1966. The University of Science and Technology was officially inaugurated on Wednesday, 20 November 1961. However, another act of Parliament (Act 559 of 1998) changed the name back to its original version, the Kwame Nkrumah University of Science and Technology, Kumasi.

Organization and administration

Principal officers 

The principal officers of the university are the chancellor, chairman of the University Council and vice-chancellor. As of 2018, the position of chancellor was held by the Asantehene Otumfuo Osei Tutu II.

Governing body 
Governance is carried out by the University Council, primarily through the Academic Board, which is responsible for:
 formulating and carrying out the academic policy of the university
 devising and regulating the courses of instruction and study, and supervising research
 regulating the conduct of examinations and the award of degrees, diplomas and certificates
 advising the University Council on the admission of students and the award of scholarships
 reporting on such matters as may be referred to it by the University Council

Student participation in university administration 
Students through the KNUST Students' Representative Council (KNUST SRC) participate in the administration of the university through their representatives serving on the University Council, Academic Board, the Welfare Services Board, Faculty and Departmental Boards, Residence Committee, Library Committee and on the Hall Councils.
 
The council operates with a budget that is primarily dispensed to student organizations, but it also funds social events and student initiatives. As the sole representative student government, the KNUST SRC provides student services like most student unions and also performs advocacy on behalf of the student body.

Collegiate system 

KNUST has, since January 2005, transformed from its previous centralized system of administration into a decentralized collegiate university. Under this system, the faculties have been condensed into six colleges.

The university had been administered on the faculty-based system. This led to administrative difficulties as new faculties and institutes were created to meet the ever-growing academic pursuits of students. To solve this problem, a collegiate system was officially adopted on 29 November 2004. On 5 April 2005, the pioneering provosts were inducted and invested into office at the Great Hall of the KNUST.

The colleges are semi-autonomous, which means that they are given the power to largely run on their own without much dependence on the central administration for financial support. A college registrar, finance officer and librarian assist the provosts. Under them are the faculties, centres and institutes, headed by deans and directors. As heads of the colleges, the provosts provide academic and administrative leadership for the colleges and oversee their overall running.

Housing and accommodation 
There are numerous KNUST approved hostels, mostly in close proximity to the main campus. Students of all financial backgrounds have their accommodation needs catered for. There are six halls of residence at the Kumasi campus, each administered by a hall council consisting of senior and junior members. There are few hostels on campus like the GUSSS hostels, Brunei, and Tek credit hostel. The executive head is the hall master, who is assisted by a senior tutor. There is a hall bursar and other supporting staff.

Halls of residence 

 University Hall (Katanga)
 Unity Hall (Conti)
 Independence Hall
 Queens Hall
 Republic Hall
 Africa Hall

Hostels 
About 60% of the student population is non-resident. There are private hostels around the campus and in Kumasi for students who, as a result of the limited facilities/rooms, could not be admitted as resident students.

There are facilities on campus where non-resident students can rest between lectures and study before they leave for their homes and hostels.

In January 2014, the top floor of the Crystal Rose Hostel caught fire while most students were on vacation. The cause of the fire is still not known.

International students 
There is a large multinational international community at KNUST as a result of the high standards of education. There is an international student association that sees to the interests of foreign students such as accommodation, orientation and campus tours.

Academics 

From the 2010/11 academic year some of the colleges operate a two-tier system, while others maintain their three-tier system.

College of Agriculture and Natural Resources CANR 
 Faculty of Agriculture
 Department of Agricultural Economics, Agribusiness and Extension
 Department of Animal Sciences
 Department of Crop and Soil Sciences
 Department of Horticulture

 Faculty of Renewable Natural Resources
 Department of Agroforestry
 Department of Fisheries and Watershed Management
 Department of Silviculture and Forest Management
 Department of Wildlife and Range Management
 Department of Wood Science and Technology

 Faculty of Forest Resources Technology
 Department of Ecotourism and Forest Recreation
 Department of Land Reclamation and Rehabilitation
 Department of Social Forestry
 Department of Wood Processing and Marketing

College of Health Sciences 
 Faculty of Allied Health Sciences
 Department of Medical Laboratory Technology
 Department of Nursing
 Department of Sonography
 Department of Sports and Exercise Science

 Faculty of Pharmacy and Pharmaceutical Sciences
Department of Pharmaceutical Chemistry
Department of Pharmacology
Department of Pharmacognosy
Department of Pharmacy Practice
Department of Pharmaceutics
Department of Herbal Medicine
Dental School
School of Medical Sciences
School of Veterinary Medicine

College of Humanities and Social Sciences 
 Faculty of Law
 Faculty of Social Sciences
 Department of Economics
 Department of English
 Department of Geography and Rural Development
 Department of History and Political Studies
 Department of Modern Languages
 Department of Religious Studies
 Department of Sociology and Social Work

 School of Business

Colleges under the two-tier system (Provost/Head of Department):

College of Art and Built Environment 

The College of Art and Built Environment formerly known as College of Architecture and Planning came into existence in January 2005 as part of the restructuring of the University into a Collegiate System. In the restructuring, the Faculty of Environmental and Development studies (FEDS) and the Institute of Land Management and Development (ILMAD) were merged to form the College. FEDS comprised three teaching departments: Department of Architecture, department of Building Technology and Department of Housing and Planning Research. ILMAD comprised two departments, Department of Land Economy and the Land Resources Centre. The college currently comprises two faculties, ten teaching departments and one research institute:
 Department of Communication Design
 Department of General Art Studies
 Department of Painting and Sculpture
 Department of Integrated Rural Art/Industry
 Department of Industrial Art
Department of Educational Innovations in Science and Technology
 Department of Publishing Studies
 Department of Architecture
 Department of Building Technology
 Department of Land Economy
Department of Planning
 Centre for Settlements Studies
 Centre for Land Studies

College of Engineering 
 Department of Agricultural Engineering
 Department of Aerospace Engineering
 Department of Chemical Engineering
 Department of Civil Engineering
 Department of Computer Engineering
 Department of Electrical Engineering/Electronic Engineering & Telecommunication Engineering
 Department of Geological Engineering
 Department of Geodetic Engineering
 Department of Geomatic Engineering
 Department of Materials Engineering
 Department of Mechanical Engineering
 Department of Petroleum Engineering

College of Science 
 Department of Biochemistry and Biotechnology
 Department of Chemistry
 Department of Computer Science
 Department of Environmental Science
 Department of Food Science and Technology
 Department of Mathematics
 Department of Optometry and Visual Science
 Department of Physics
 Department of Theoretical and Applied Biology
 Department of Statistics and Actuarial Sciences

Institute of Distance Learning 
In the year 2005, the KNUST adopted distance learning as a viable complement to the conventional face-to-face system of education. This decision was made to offer opportunity for people to pursue academic programmes with the Kwame Nkrumah University of Science and Technology, while still on full-time employment.

In October 2007, the Academic Board changed the status of the Faculty of Distance Learning to the Institute of Distance Learning.

Library and digital resources 
The KNUST Library provides information in electronic and print formats to staff and students mainly to support teaching, learning and research in science and technology for national development. It is a depository library for all materials published in Ghana and for international institutions and organisations like the World Bank and other United Nations Agencies.

Digital services are available through the Open Educational Resource (OER) as well as the DSpace repository.

 The Open educational resources (OER) component of the Kwame Nkrumah University of Science and Technology fosters collaboration on curricula, course materials, and content; generates connections between disciplines, teachers, and learners; and inspires use of educational materials in a more effective way.
 KNUST Online Repository is the university's digital repository. Data for the repository is still being added.

Affiliated institutions 
 Accra Institute of Technology
 Akim State University College
 All Nations University College
 Central University College
 DataLink University College(DLUC)
 Garden City University College
 Ghana Telecom University College
 Ho Polytechnic
 Osei Tutu II Institute for Advanced ICT Studies
 Regent University College
 Spiritan Institute / Spiritan University College

In December 2019, an agreement was signed between the Gambian government and Kwame Nkrumah University of Science and Technology to set up Science, Technology and Engineering University in The Gambia. In the accord, the administrative and teaching faculties will be set up, coached by and affiliated to KNUST.

Research centres 
 Bureau of Integrated Research and Development
 Centre for Biodiversity Utilisation and Development (CBUD)
 Centre for Cultural and African Studies
 Centre for Human Studies
 Dairy/Beef Research Station
 The Brew-Hammond Energy Centre, College Of Engineering
 Kumasi Center For Collaborative Research(KCCR) in collaboration with the German Bernhard Nocht Institute for Tropical Medicine
 National Institute for Mathematical Sciences (NIMS)
 Technology Consultancy Centre (TCC)
 Laboratory For Interdisciplinary Statistical Analysis (LISA)

Media

Radio
Focus FM (94.3 FM) is the university's official radio station. Among its notable programmes are Morning Show, Drive Time, Teknokrat and Community Watch.

About Focus FM 
Focus FM is a network radio positioned on campus of Kwame Nkrumah University of Science and Technology, Kumasi. It was established in the year 2000 A.D. The stakeholders are the UNIVERSITY, Student Representative Counsel and the Graduate Student Association of Ghana. The center targets for the status quo of the station is to inform, teach and entertain the whole college network and the encompassing communities. The important supply of investment is from students’ contribution into Focus FM improvement account.

How Focus FM Is Defined 
Focus FM is focused not only to participate in the activities of the community, but in addition to allow the university to take part in the life of the station. This is why it is differentiated from other commercial and state radio – neither of which is seeks public participation, except when it suits them to do so. Focus FM offers democratic access to the activity of programme making itself. rather than being communicated at, people are offered the opportunity to communicate themselves.

Finance 
Focus FM is a not-for-profit station. It secures its income from; Focus FM Development Fund, a form of commercial Sponsorship focused at serving the community, and a range of community / listener supported fundraisers.

Ghanaian Journalists Who Trained At Focus FM 

 Nana Kwadwo Jantuah
 Edward Oppong Marfo
 Kwame Adinkra
 Kojo Akoto Boateng
 Louis Kwame Sakyiamah (Lexis Bill)
 Anita Kuma
 Kojo Akoto Boateng

Television

TEK TV is the official television station of the university.

Awards and recognition

In November 2019, KNUST was ranked as the best university in Ghana and West Africa by U.S. News & World Report and still holds the record in 2020. It was also ranked 14th in Africa and 706th in the world, with a global score of 42.4.

KNUST was the first university in West Africa to have won the 2018, 2019 and 2020 Pan African Universities Debate Championship consecutively. KNUST is the first university in Ghana to win the Ghana national rounds of the Philip C. Jessup International Law Moot Court Competition. The university has also won the Philip C. Jessup International Law Moot Court Competition a record three consecutive times. In December 2020 KNUST became the first university in Africa to have won the Pan African Universities Debating Championship for 3 consecutive times.

Notable people

Notable alumni
 
In government and diplomacy, Aliu Mahama Vice-president of Ghana from 2001 to 2008, studied at KNUST. Edward Kwame Wiredu, former Chief Justice of Ghana, was also a student at KNUST. Former first lady of Ghana Nana Konadu Agyeman-Rawlings is an alumnus. Samira Bawumia, current second lady of Ghana, also is an alumnus.

UN Secretary-General and Nobel Peace Prize Laureate Kofi Annan had a part of his education at KNUST.
Kwaku Aning and Hackman Owusu-Agyeman are other diplomats who graduated from KNUST.

Notable graduates from KNUST College of Engineering include the chemical engineer Thomas Mensah, former CEO of GNPC Alex Mould, CEO of Ghana Gas Benjamin Asante, and former CEO of Tullow Ghana Limited Charles Darku.

The novelist Amma Darko attended KNUST. Actor Chris Attoh attended KNUST.

Nana Otuo Siriboe, the Juabenhene who is also Chairman of Council of State, and economist and former Vice Chancellor of the University of Ghana Ernest Aryeetey, graduated from the institution. Senior Minister Yaw Osafo-Maafo graduated from the institution. Chairperson of the Uganda Planning Authority Pamela Mbabazi was also a student at KNUST.

Notable academics
Francis Allotey, mathematician
Aba Andam, physicist
Ablade Glover, artist
Marr Grounds, American / Australian artist and lecturer in architecture in 1966–7
Thomas Mensah, chemical engineer
Letitia Obeng, research scientist

References

External links 
 
 Universities of Ghana Overseas Office
 Students Representative Council

 
Ashanti Empire
Education in Kumasi
Forestry education
Educational institutions established in 1952
1952 establishments in Gold Coast (British colony)